Neethikku Thandanai is a 1987 Indian Tamil-language film, directed by S. A. Chandrasekhar and written by M. Karunanidhi. The film stars Raadhika, Nizhalgal Ravi, Charan Raj and Senthil. It was released on 1 May 1987. The film was remade in Hindi as Kudrat Ka Kanoon (1987) and in Telugu as Nyayaniki Siksha (1988).

Plot

Cast 

Raadhika
Nizhalgal Ravi
Charan Raj
Senthil
S. S. Chandran
Ravichandran
Srividya
S. A. Chandrasekhar
Senthamarai
Vasanth
Karnan (debut)
Charuhasan
V. Gopalakrishnan
Senapathi
Amjath Kumar
Suruli Vel
Nagaraja Chozhan
LIC Narasimhan
Omakuchi Narasimhan
Kutty Padmini
Kovai Sarala
Solochana
Sri Asha (debut)

Production 
In the late 1980s, politician and writer M. Karunanidhi was arrested and S. A. Chandrasekhar thought the law was wrong to do so; this inspired the title for their next film Neethikku Thandanai. Karunanidhi wrote the script while in prison. The original title was Idhu Nyayama, but Chandrasekhar changed it to Neethikku Thandanai.

Soundtrack 
The music was composed by M. S. Viswanathan. Swarnalatha, who made her playback singing debut with the song "Chinnanchiru Kiliye", based on the poem by Subramania Bharati, was chosen to sing the song by Viswanathan after he was impressed with her rendition of his composition "Paal Polave" from Uyarndha Manithan (1968), which he had asked her to sing during the song's audition.

Release and reception 
Neethikku Thandanai was released on 1 May 1987. N. Krishnaswamy of The Indian Express wrote that the "story and narration are so thoroughly mired in preposterous situations". He went on to say, "M. S. Viswanathan has tuned a Bharathi song to good effect, but how come Bharathi agreed to write a song for this film?".

Controversy 
The film became controversial as the dialogues were by the former chief minister Karunanidhi. The then ruling party AIADMK, led by the incumbent chief minister M. G. Ramachandran, tried to halt the release by filing a case that the film may disrupt law-and-order situation in Tamil Nadu, but Chandrasekhar overcame the case.

References

Bibliography

External links 
 

1980s Tamil-language films
1987 films
Films directed by S. A. Chandrasekhar
Films scored by M. S. Viswanathan
Films with screenplays by M. Karunanidhi
Indian courtroom films
Indian rape and revenge films
Tamil films remade in other languages